The 1973 Cork Junior Hurling Championship was the 76th staging of the Cork Junior Hurling Championship since its establishment by the Cork County Board.

On 11 November 1973, Ballinhassig won the championship following a 1-06 to 0-05 defeat of Meelin in the final at the Coachford Sportsfield. This was their second championship title overall and a first title since 1965.

Results

Quarter-finals

Semi-finals

Final

References

Cork Junior Hurling Championship
Cork Junior Hurling Championship